The 1st Infantry Division is a military formation of the Korean People's Army.It was part of the North Korean advance from Seoul to Taejon.

The division fought in the Battle of Pusan Perimeter.

The intelligence section of U.S Far East Command headquarters listed the divisions order of battle as of 31 July 1952 as follows:
2nd Regiment
3rd Regiment
14th Regiment
Artillery Regiment

This same report listed the 1st Division as being in III Corps Reserve at the same time period.

References

InfDiv0001
InfDiv0001NK